Marin or Marín is a common surname in Romance-speaking Europe and Latin America, while also being a given name in Croatia, Albania and Bulgaria. It is a variant of the Latin name Marinus.

Surname
 Alexandru Marin (1945–2005), French-born Romanian-American physicist
 André Marin, (born 1965), ombudsman of Ontario
 Andreea Marin (born 1974), Romanian television presenter
 Angel Marin (born 1942), Vice President of Bulgaria
 Biagio Marin (1891–1985), Italian poet
 Carlos Francisco Chang Marín (1922–2012), Panamanian
 Carol Marin (born 1948), American television and print journalist
 Charles-Paul Marin de la Malgue (1633–1713), French officer & explorer in Canada
 Cheech Marin (born 1946), American comedian and actor
 Chief Marin (c. 1781 – 1839), a Coast Miwok chief
 Constantin Marin (1925-2011), Romanian musician
 Cristina Marin (born 1981), Romanian gymnast
 Diego Marín Aguilera (died 1799), Spanish inventor who attempted flight
 Edmond Marin La Meslée (1912–1945), French fighter pilot in World War II
 Francisco A. Marcos-Marín, linguist
 Gabriel Marin (born 1972), Romanian rower
 Gheorghe Gaston Marin (1918–2010), Romanian-Jewish communist politician 
 Gilberte Marin-Moskovitz (1937–2019), French politician
 Gladys Marin (1941–2005), Chilean activist and political figure
 Guadalupe Marín (1895–1983), "Lupe Marín", Mexican model and novelist, wife of Diego Rivera
 Ion Marin, Romanian-born Austrian conductor
 Jacques Marin (1919–2001), French actor
 Joel Marin (born 1994), Finnish murderer
 John Marin (1870–1953), American painter
 José Maria Marin (born 1932), Brazilian politician
 Joseph Marin de la Malgue (1719–1774), explorer in Canada
 Luciana Marin (born 1988), Romanian handballer
 Luis Muñoz Marín (1898–1980), Puerto Rico poet, journalist and politician
 Mariana Marin (1956-2003), Romanian poet
 Marilena Marin, Italian politician
 Marko Marin (professor), Slovenian theatre director and art historian
 Manuel Marín (1949–2017), Spanish politician
 Michael Marin (1968-2012), American financier
 Michael L. Marin, American doctor and vascular surgeon
 Peter Marin, Australian session drummer
 Petre Marin (born 1973), Romanian footballer
 Rafael Marin (born 1959), Spanish science fiction novelist and comic book writer
 Răzvan Marin (born 1996), Romanian footballer
 Rosario Marin, treasurer of the United States
 Ruth Rivera Marín (1927–1969), Mexican architect
 Sanna Marin (born 1985), Finnish politician and the 46th Prime Minister of Finland
 William Miranda Marín (1940–2010), mayor of Caguas, Puerto Rico

Sports
 Carolina Marín (born 1993), Spanish badminton player
 Jack Marin (born 1944), American basketball player
 José Marín (racewalker) (born 1950), Spanish race walker
 Juan Antonio Marín (born 1975), Costa Rican male tennis player
 Luca Marin (born 1986), Italian swimmer
 Luis Marín (footballer, born 1974), Costa Rican football (soccer) player
 Luis Marín Sabater (1906–1974), Spanish football (soccer) player
 Marco Marin (born 1963), Italian Olympic fencer
 Marko Marin (born 1989), German football (soccer) player 
 Mihail Marin (born 1965), Romanian chess Grandmaster 
 Nicolas Marin (born 1980), French football (soccer) player
 Olimpiu Marin (born 1969), Romanian sports shooter
 Oscar Marin (born 1982), American baseball coach
 Petre Marin (born 1973), Romanian football (soccer) player
 Răzvan Marin (born 1996), Romanian footballer
 Vladimir Marín (born 1979), Colombian football (soccer) player

Fictional characters
 Daley Marin
 Eagle Marin
 Lex Marin
 Hanna Marin

Given name

 Marin Alsop (born 1956), American conductor and violinist, and music director of the Baltimore Symphony Orchestra
 Marin Barleti (c. 1450-c. 1520), Albanian historian and Catholic priest
 Marin Boucher (1587 or 1589–1671), early settler in New France
 Marin Ceaușescu (1916–1989), Romanian economist and diplomat, and older brother of former President Nicolae Ceauşescu
 Marin Čilić (born 1988), Croatian professional tennis player
Marin Clark, American earth scientist
 Marin Drăcea (1885–1958), Romanian silviculturist
 Marin Drinov (1838–1906), Bulgarian historian and philologist
 Marin Držić (1508–1567), Croatian Renaissance playwright and prose writer
 Marin Getaldić (1568–1626), mathematician and physicist born in Dubrovnik
 Marin Goleminov (1908–2000), Bulgarian composer, violinist, conductor and pedagogue
 Marin Hamill (born 2001), American freestyle skier
 Marin Hinkle (born 1966), American actress
 Marin Honda (本田 真凜, born 2001), Japanese figure skater
 Marin Ireland (born 1979), American actress 
 Marin Karmitz (born 1938), French businessman, film producer, director and distributor
 Marin Mägi-Efert (born 1982), Estonian actress
 Marin Marais (1656–1728), French Baroque music composer
 Marin Mazzie (1960-2018), American actress and singer
 Marin Mema (born 1981), Albanian journalist 
 Marin Mersenne (1588–1648), French theologian, philosopher, mathematician and music theorist
 Marin Morrison, (1990–2009), American Paralympic swimmer
 Marin Preda (1922–1980), Romanian novelist
 Marin Rozić (born 1983), Croatian professional basketball player
 Marin Sais (1890–1971), American film actress
 Marin Soljačić (born 1974), Croatian physicist and electrical engineer
 Marin, alias of Japanese DJ Yoshinori Sunahara
 Marin Sorescu (1936–1996), Romanian poet, playwright, and novelist, and Minister of Culture
 Marin Skender (born 1979), Croatian football goalkeeper
 Marin Tufan (born 1942), Romanian footballer

See also
 Marin (disambiguation)
 Marinescu (surname)
 Marinović
 Mărinești (disambiguation)
 Marinello
 Saint Marinus, the founder of San Marino

Unisex given names

sl:Marin